The Dragon Tree Spell Book is a 1981 fantasy role-playing game supplement published by Dragon Tree Press.

Contents
The Dragon Tree Spell Book is a compendium of 225 spells, for use with fantasy role-playing games, especially Dungeons & Dragons.

Reception
Lewis Pulsipher reviewed The Dragon Tree Spell Book in The Space Gamer No. 47. Pulsipher commented that "The other spell compendium I've seen, Spell Law [...] includes eight times as many spells as Spell Book, but many of those are simple variations. Spell Book may be more compatible with AD&D, but less with other FRPG than Spell Law.  In view of the competition, Spell Book would be worth [somewhat less than its price], but [its price] is a little steep unless you're a spell collector of connoisseur."

References

Fantasy role-playing game supplements
Role-playing game supplements introduced in 1981